Free Air Humidity Manipulation (FAHM) experiment is a large-scale field experiment in Estonia,

FAHM was established by plant biologists (ecophysiologists and applied ecologists) of the University of Tartu to investigate the long term effects of increasing air humidity on tree performance and on the functioning of the deciduous forest ecosystem. The design of the FAHM experiment is based on the Free Air Carbon dioxide Enrichment (FACE) technology.

FAHM (58°14′N, 27°18′E) is located within the Järvselja Training and Experimental Forest District in the village of Rõka, Tartu county,  FAHM infrastructure enables to increase air relative humidity up to 18% unit above ambient level (long-term mean increase 7%).

References 	

Ecology
Tartu County
Botany